As-Sayeh was an Arabic-language magazine founded in New York City by Abd al-Masih Haddad in 1912. It continued to be published until 1957. It presented the works of prominent Mahjari literary figures in the United States (such as Amin Rihani, Kahlil Gibran, Mikha'il Na'ima and Elia Abu Madi) and became the "spokesman" of the Pen League which he co-founded with Nasib Arida in 1915 or 1916. Haddad published his own collection Hikayat al-Mahjar (The Stories of Expatriation) inside it in 1921.

Notes

References

Bibliography

Arabic-language magazines
Magazines established in 1912
Magazines disestablished in 1957
Defunct literary magazines published in the United States
Magazines published in New York City